Steve White may refer to:

Sports
Steve White (American football) (1973–2022), American football player 
Steve White (baseball) (1884–1975), Major League Baseball pitcher
Steve White (footballer) (born 1959), former English footballer and manager
Steve White (sailor) Offshore Racer

Musicians
Steve White (drummer) (born 1965), drummer for several British bands
Steve White (guitarist) (born 1965), guitarist for KMFDM and PIG
Steve White (saxophonist) (1925–2005), Los Angeles-based jazz saxophonist who flourished in the 1950s

Others
Steve White (actor) (born 1961), American actor and comedian
Steve White (author) (born 1948), American science fiction writer and former Navy officer
Steve White (comics) (born 1964), comic writer
Steve White (judge) (born 1949), judge and former Inspector General of the California Department of Corrections and Rehabilitation

See also
Steven White (disambiguation)
Stephen White (disambiguation)
Stephen Whyte (disambiguation)
White (surname)